Hlíðar or Hlíðahverfi  is a sub-municipal administrational district within Reykjavík, Iceland. It includes six neighbourhoods: Hlíðar proper, Norðurmýri , Holt , Hlemmur , Suðurhlíðar  and Öskjuhlíð .

External links

Districts of Reykjavík